System 32 may refer to:

IBM System/32, a computer.
 System32, a special folder in the Windows operating system containing systems and libraries.
 Sega System 32, an arcade system board.
32 Ly cabinetmaking system, a cabinetmaking system that is based on multiples of 32 mm